Mark Vernon Jones   is a Canadian sportscaster for ABC and ESPN and the primary play-by-play announcer for Sacramento Kings games on NBC Sports California. Jones has been a member of the ESPN broadcasting family since 1990. Before then Jones worked for The Sports Network (TSN) in Canada. He mostly works college football and NBA games on ABC and ESPN.

Biography

Mark Jones was born on November 16, 1961.

Basketball career

Jones attended York University and played basketball. He led the team to three Ontario Universities Athletics Association (OUAA) championships in 1981, 1984 and 1985. During his career, Jones was one of the top players in the OUAA, earning conference second-team all-star honours in 1984 and 1985. In 1986, he finished his career with a first-team all-star nod. A prolific guard for the Yeomen, Jones still ranks in the program's top five all-time in total assists and steals. He was inducted into the York's Sport Hall of Fame in 2016.

Broadcasting career
Before Jones assumed his current roles at ESPN, he worked for The Sports Network (TSN) in Canada from 1986 to 1990 as an anchor and hosted a Toronto Blue Jays magazine show.

Jones began his ESPN career as the host of the weekly NBA show, the NBA Today. He would usually end the show by shooting an imaginary basketball into the air as the studio lights went off. Jones currently does play-by-play on NBA games paired with any one of ESPN's current NBA game analysts like Jon Barry, Hubie Brown, P.J. Carlesimo, Mark Jackson, Jeff Van Gundy, and Doris Burke. Jones has worked NBA games in the past with Bill Walton until Walton left NBA coverage during the 2009 - 2010 season and also with Doug Collins. He was the primary host of KIA NBA Shootaround, the network's pregame show. On the program he engaged Walton and Stephen A. Smith in topical debates about issues in the NBA. Jones has done some sideline reporting for NBA games.

Jones also is lead play by play announcer on ABC's NBA Sunday Showcase with Hall of Famer Hubie Brown. He also is on ESPN's college football, where he teams up with analysts Dusty Dvoracek and Rod Gilmore on the network's coverage on ESPN, ESPN2 or ABC. He formally called men's SEC college basketball games on Saturday with analyst Kara Lawson.  He has also done play-by-play and/or reporting for women's college basketball, the WNBA, and the NHL.

Jones has also occasionally served as an anchor/reporter for SportsCenter. He has contributed to NBA All-Star Weekend (Celebrity Game), NBA Draft Lottery, and also to the network's NBA Draft coverage.

He is the younger brother of Paul Jones, the radio play-by-play voice of the Toronto Raptors.

In September 2020, Jones made headlines with his outspoken support for the Black Lives Matter movement on Twitter.

Jones was named the primary TV play-by-play announcer for the Sacramento Kings in 2020.

On March 11, 2022, ESPN announced a multi-year extension for Jones.

On May 29, 2022, Jones filled in for ESPN's lead NBA play–by–play announcer Mike Breen for the deciding Eastern Conference Final Game 7 between the Boston Celtics and Miami Heat. Breen had to sit out of the broadcast alongside commentators Jeff Van Gundy and Mark Jackson due to a positive COVID test. Jones also called the first two games of the NBA Finals featuring the Celtics and Golden State Warriors in Breen's absence.

References

Living people
Arena football announcers
Basketball players from Toronto
Black Canadian basketball players
Black Canadian broadcasters
Canadian expatriate basketball people in the United States 
Canadian expatriate sportspeople in the United States 
Canadian television sportscasters
College basketball announcers in the United States
College football announcers
Canadian people of Jamaican descent
Disney people
ESPN people
Miami Heat announcers
National Basketball Association broadcasters
National Hockey League broadcasters
NBA G League broadcasters
Sacramento Kings announcers
Women's college basketball announcers in the United States
Women's National Basketball Association announcers
York Lions players
1987 births